The Georg-Gaßmann-Stadion is a multi-purpose stadium in the district of Ockershausen in Marburg, Germany, named after the former politician and mayor of the city, Georg Gaßmann.

The stadium, opened in 1967, is primarily used by the American football team Marburg Mercenaries, who play in the German Football League. VfB Marburg, the city's highest ranked association football team, also use the ground for friendlies and cup games against higher-ranked opponents. The Thorpe Cup athletics meetings in 2009 and 2010 were also held at the stadium.

With its 12,000 capacity, the Georg-Gaßmann-Stadion is the largest in the region of Mittelhessen.

References

External links 

 Georg-Gaßmann-Stadion on Marburg's municipal website 

Buildings and structures in Marburg
VfB Marburg
Football venues in Germany
Athletics (track and field) venues in Germany
Sports venues in Hesse
American football venues in Germany
1967 establishments in Germany
Sports venues completed in 1967